Helvetia Township is located in Madison County, Illinois, in the United States. As of the 2010 census, its population was 8,646 and it contained 3,638 housing units.

History
Helvetia Township was organized in 1876.

Geography

Demographics

References

External links
City-data.com
Illinois State Archives

Townships in Madison County, Illinois
Townships in Illinois